Walter Alfredo Novellino (born 4 June 1953), is an Italian football manager and former player, who played as a midfielder.

Club career
Novellino was born at Montemarano, province of Avellino. After spending his childhood in São Paulo, Brazil, he later returned to Italy, and started his professional career with Torino, then obtaining his major successes with Perugia and A.C. Milan, and being nicknamed Monzon (after an Argentine boxer) due to both his physical resemblance to him and his determination on the pitch. Novellino announced his retirement in 1987. In his first season with Milan, he helped the club to their tenth Serie A title in 1979. When the club was relegated following their involvement in the Totonero 1980 match-fixing scandal, he remained with the team and helped Milan win the Serie B title and immediately obtain promotion back to Serie A; during the 1980–81 Serie B season, he notably scored the goal against Monza which secured promotion for the club.

International career
Novellino won one cap for the Italy national football team in 1978.

Style of play
A talented yet tenacious and hard-working midfielder, Novellino was known for excellent technical ability, offensive capabilities, fighting spirit, and dribbling skills. Although he was usually played as an attacking midfielder, he was also capable of playing as a winger, as a second striker, or as a forward.

Managerial career
Novellino made his debut in management in 1992 with Perugia of Serie C1, but this was short-lived. Next season, he moved to Gualdo whom he led in two years to win first Serie C2 and then to a spot in the Serie C1 promotion play-off finals which they eventually lost to Avellino. He then went on to Serie B sides Perugia, Ravenna and then in Venezia whom he led to Serie A for the first time in the club history.

In 2000, he led Napoli to a Serie A promotion, and repeated the feat the following season with Piacenza. In 2002, he joined Sampdoria, immediately leading the team to a Serie A promotion, the fourth time he'd helped a team achieve this goal. In his first Serie A season with Sampdoria, they achieved a 5th place and a UEFA Cup qualification, but lost the battle with Udinese for the last UEFA Champions League place. He left Sampdoria in 2007 to join Torino, where he was fired on 16 April 2008 following disappointing results that left the team in the relegation zone; he was replaced by Gianni De Biasi who ultimately managed to save the granata from relegation.

On 8 December, only a few months after his dismissal, he was called back to Torino following the sacking of De Biasi, taking over the team in 18th place and 12 only points achieved in 15 games. He was fired once again on 24 March 2009, after a sequence of negative results that left Torino in deep relegation zone, being replaced by Giancarlo Camolese.

In July 2009 he was appointed new head coach of Reggina, with the aim to lead the Calabrians promptly back to the top flight. However, he managed to achieve only nine points in ten games, being ultimately dismissed on 24 October following a 0–2 loss to his former club Torino.

On 14 February 2011 he was unveiled as new head coach of Serie B club Livorno, replacing Giuseppe Pillon at the helm of the Amaranto, until 21 December 2011 when he rescinds the contract by mutual agreement with the company.

On 10 March 2016 he was appointed Palermo manager. He was sacked on 11 April 2016.

On 29 November 2016 he was called in by struggling Serie B side Avellino to replace outcoming manager Domenico Toscano. He was dismissed by Avellino on 3 April 2018.

On 1 July 2021 he was hired by Serie C's Juve Stabia to be the club’s new manager. He was sacked on 17 October 2021 following a negative start in the 2021–22 Serie C campaign. On 28 February 2022, he was reinstated as Juve Stabia boss following the dismissal of Stefano Sottili, who had replaced him earlier during the season. He left Juve Stabia once again after the 2021–22 season.

Style of management
Novellino favours a 4–4–2 formation which makes use of a zonal marking defensive system, a deep-lying playmaker in midfield, and a physical centre-forward fielded alongside a more mobile and talented second striker.

Managerial statistics

Honours

Player
Milan
Serie A (1): 1978–79
Serie B (1): 1980–81
Mitropa Cup (1): 1981–82

Perugia
Coppa Piano Karl Rappan (1): 1978

Manager
Gualdo
Serie C2 (1): 1993–94 (girone B)

Individual
A.C. Milan Hall of Fame

References

1953 births
Living people
Sportspeople from the Province of Avellino
Italian footballers
Italy international footballers
Italian football managers
A.C. Perugia Calcio managers
A.S. Gualdo Calcio managers
Ravenna F.C. managers
Venezia F.C. managers
S.S.C. Napoli managers
Piacenza Calcio 1919 managers
U.C. Sampdoria managers
Torino F.C. managers
U.S. Livorno 1915 managers
Modena F.C. managers
Palermo F.C. managers
Serie A managers
Serie A players
Serie B players
A.C. Legnano players
U.S. Cremonese players
Empoli F.C. players
Ascoli Calcio 1898 F.C. players
Torino F.C. players
A.C. Perugia Calcio players
A.C. Milan players
Catania S.S.D. players
Association football midfielders
Footballers from Campania